Sydney Courtauld JP  (1840–1899) was a Crêpe and Silk manufacturer, and part of the Courtauld family empire in Great Britain

Personal life

He was born on 10 March 1840 in Bocking, Braintree, Essex. He was the son of George Courtauld (1802–1861) and Susanna Sewell (1803–1888). He married Sarah Lucy Sharpe on 4 April 1865 at the Unitarian Chapel, Islington, London. Children from the marriage included:
Sir William Julien Courtauld 1st Bt. JP  (16 June 1870 - 1940)
Sydney Renée Courtauld  (1873–1962)
Samuel Courtauld  (27 May 1876 – 1 December 1947) 
Catharine Courtauld (1878–1972)
John Sewell Courtauld MC MP (30 August 1880 – 20 April 1942)
Sir Stephen Lewis Courtauld MC  (27 February 1882 – 1967)

He was a Justice of the Peace for Essex.  He built a house called Bocking Place in Braintree, Essex between 1885 and 1887. The architect was Ernest Flint. It was one of the first buildings in Essex equipped with electric lighting.

He was a horticulturalist and was the first person who managed to get the orchid Masdevallia costaricensis (now renamed Masdevallia marginella) to flower in England. He donated the Braintree and Bocking Public Gardens to the people of Braintree on 26 November 1888.

Sydney Courtauld died on 20 October 1899 in Gosfield, Essex.

References

External links
 

1840 births
1899 deaths
Sydney
English horticulturists
English justices of the peace
People from Bocking, Essex
English businesspeople
British textile industry businesspeople
English people of French descent